Michalis Koumbios (born 1965) is a Greek composer and lyricist.

Koumbios was born in 1965 on the island of Rhodes and lived on the nearby island of Tilos for the first few years of his life.

He studied Byzantine, classical and modern European music, as well as the traditional music of the world’s peoples. He also attended seminars on modern music technology in Greece and abroad.

Koumbios has made 15 recordings and his compositions have also been included in international collections such as Mystic World, Famous Greek Composer, Night Collection, Buddha Bar, Mother Earth, Putumayo Presents: Greece, a musical odyssey. He has produced world projects such as Zambetas Concept, Gypsies Bar, Balkan Voices I and Balkan Voices II.

Michalis Koumbios is a composer in the ancient Greek sense of the word, sometimes writing lyrics and producing, as well as being an expert in sound and recording.

He has worked with the most distinguished Greek musicians, singers and lyricists as well as with the most recognized names in world music. His music has been used on television programmes and series, documentaries in Greece and abroad. He has also been editor of the music magazine Difono.

References

1965 births
Living people
Greek composers
People from Tilos